Almost Genius is an American cable television series that premiered December 29, 2015 and ended July 18, 2016 on truTV.

About 
Almost Genius is a half-hour viral video clip show, hosted by comedians April Richardson and Chris Fairbanks. Like the network's previous longtime staple World's Dumbest, the show also involves a cast of comedians (some of them also from World's Dumbest) giving humorous commentary on videos of people, places, and things that try hard to succeed, but fall just a little short. However, unlike World's Dumbest, instead of mocking the subjects, the commentators congratulate them for their bravery and ingenuity. The show is produced by Meetinghouse Productions, the same company that also produced World's Dumbest.

Episodes

Season 1 (2015–2016)

References

External links 
 Almost Genius - Official Page
 
 Almost Genius Facebook page
 April Richardson - Official Page

2015 American television series debuts
2016 American television series endings
2010s American satirical television series
English-language television shows
2010s American video clip television series
2010s American reality television series
TruTV original programming